The Judiciary of Brazil is the group of public entities designated by the Brazilian constitution to carry out the country's judicial functions.

Brazil's 1988 constitution has adopted a tripartite separation of powers, with a Legislative power, an Executive power, and a Judiciary power. Aside from those, the country also has the Public Ministry which acts autonomously and has in the past been referred to as the country's fourth branch.

In terms of jurisdiction, the main division is between Common Justice and Specialized Justice. Common Justice, composed of Federal and State Justices (and the Federal District's own Justice), handles most civil and criminal cases. Specialized Justice, composed of Electoral, Military and Labor Justices, handles more specialized cases which also have their own specific procedures.

The Constitution divided the Judiciary in nine organizations: the Supreme Federal Court ( or "STF"); the National Justice Council ( or "CNJ"); the Superior Court of Justice ( or "STJ"); the Superior Labour Court ( or "TST"); the Regional Federal Courts ( or "TRFs") and Federal Judges; the Labor Courts and Judges; the Electoral Courts and Judges, the Military Courts and Judges; and the Courts and Judges of the States, Federal District and Territories. There is no judicial organization on the Municipality level.

Supreme Federal Court

The Supreme Federal Court (Supremo Tribunal Federal) is the highest body of the Brazilian Judiciary. Its main responsibility is to serve as the ultimate guardian of the Brazilian Constitution, with the roles of a constitutional court.  It is composed of eleven ministers.

Its ministers are chosen from citizens between 35 and 65 years of age, with a spotless reputation and notable juridical knowledge, initially suggested by the President, with a sabbath through the Commission of Constitution, Justice and Citizenship and then a vote where they must be approved by an Absolute majority of all members of the Brazilian Senate to then be properly named by the President.

The jurisdiction of the Court is defined by the constitution and is divided in two groups: matters of original jurisdiction, and matters of appellate jurisdiction. The difference is whether the lawsuit starts in the Court itself or reaches the court through an appeal.

Matters of original jurisdiction are: Direct Unconstitutionality Lawsuits; Constitunality Declaration Lawsuits; cases of Privileged Venue; lawsuits between a foreign state or international organization and the Brazilain Federal Government, its States, the Federal District and Territories, or  just between the internal Federal Units themselves and the Federal Government; Extradition requests; Injunction Mandates against federal entities; and other specific cases related to the Judiciary and the maintenance of the Court's authority.

Its appellate jurisdiction involves: Ordinary Appeals of decisions Superior Courts; Extraordinary Appeals of decisions of Appellate Courts which violate the constitution, declare unconstitutional a federal law, or involves conflicts between federal law and the laws of States and Municipalities;

National Justice Council

The historical precedent of the council is the National Council of Magistrature, created in 1975 with correctional powers over members of Brazilain courts, however without truly interfering in the Judiciary's autonomy. Attempts to increase this control resparked during the Constitutional Assembly of 1988, without success, and again in 1992 within the greater push for Judiciary Reform, finally being put into law 12 years later.

Created by Constitutional Amendment nº 45 of 2004, also known as the Judiciary Reform, the National Justice Council has the express purpose of controlling the administrative and financial performance of the Judiciary and the fulfillment of the duties of individual judges.

Its constitutional duties are to watch over the Judiciary's autonomy and the maintenance of the Statue of Magistrature, ensure the constitutional principles of legality, impersonality, morality, publicity and efficiency are followed by the public administration, define aspects of the internal administration of the Judiciary, receive complaints against members of the Judiciary and judge disciplinary procedures against them.

Superior Court of Justice

The Superior Court of Justice is the highest Brazilian court for non-constitutional issues concerning both states and Federal ordinary courts, dealing mainly with matters of Common Justice. Its responsibility is to standardize the interpretation of federal in the country's territory.

To achieve this purpose, the Court has a Special Appeal when a judgement rendered by a court of second instance conflicts with a federal statute disposition or when two or more second instance courts rule differently on the same federal statute.

It also serves a function in Brazil's Privileged Venue, as common crimes committed by State Governors, Appellate Court Judges, and some other positions of higher prestige in Brazil's public service are judged exclusively by the Superior Court, which also is responsible for habeas corpus and other appeals filed by these public servants.

It is composed of 33 ministers, chosen by the President of Brazil from three choices named by the Court itself, with prospective ministers also having to do a public Sabbath in the Senate in order to finally be named by the President, ministers must come from a diverse background, with a third from federal appellate courts, a third from state-level appellate courts, and the last third hailing from the Public Ministry.

Superior Labour Court

The National Council of Work, was created in 1923 as a subdivision of the Ministry of Agriculture, Industry and Commerce, as such, it was originally a branch of the Executive Power rather than the Judiciary, it would only be in 1946 that it would be reformed into the Superior Labour Court.

Headquartered in Brasilia, the Superior Labour Court is the highest court for the Labor Justice. It is composed of 27 ministers, named by the President of Brazil after approval by the Brazilian Senate, a fifth of whom must be lawyers or members of the Public Ministry, with the rest composed of Labor Judges. Its jurisdiction involves appeals from cases already in the Regional Labor Courts and cases regarding its own jurisdiction and the maintenance of its authority.

Regional Federal Courts and Federal Judges

There are five Federal Regional Courts ( - TRF), each covering several Brazilian states. They are established by articles 107 and 108 of the Constitution.

Each Federal Regional Court has at least seven judges of the second instance, named by the President, recruited preferably from the region, with at least a fifth of those recruited from lawyers with at least ten years of experience. .

The Regional Court serves mainly as an Appellate Court for cases from the Judges in the region, whose jurisdiction is defined in articles 108 and 109 of the Brazilian Constitution:

 Causes where the federal government, its agencies or enterprises have an interest, with the exception of bankruptcy and industrial injury, which are in states' jurisdiction, and also respecting the specific jurisdiction of the labor and electoral courts, which prevails over federal ordinary courts jurisdiction;
 Causes involving foreign governments or recognized international public organization;
 Political crimes;
 Crimes against the labor organization, including slavery (as decided in 2006 by the STF);
 Crimes committed aboard ships or aircraft;
 Foreigners and nationality rights;
 Indigenous peoples' rights.

As a matter of internal organization, while the Regional Courts involve several States, they are internally divided between the States, with each State having its own Section, headquartered in the Capital, with Subsections defined by law spread over the cities of the State.

Regional Labor Courts and Labor Judges

Together with the Superior Labour Court, the Regional Labor Courts and Labor Judges compose the general Labor Justice System of Brazil, with jurisdiction over most labor cases, including collective cases regarding Trade Unions. They have no jurisdiction over civil servants, except in specific cases at the municipal level and employees of nationalised companies, such as Petrobras and the Correios.

The first instance is composed of the Labor Judges, organized in specific Labor Courts (present in most major cities, with jurisdiction to receive most complaints from individual workers, often without the need of a lawyer, and also judge administrative matters concerning labor law. Exceptionally, when there is no Labor Court, cases of labor law can be presented to the local judge.

The second instance is composed of the Regional Labor Courts, organized in 22 regions over the country, most of those receiving a specific State, these Courts have jurisdiction over collective complaints on the state-level and also appellate jurisdiction over cases handled by the local judges.

The Regional Labor Courts are composed of at least seven judges, unofficially given the title of Desembargador, recruited preferably from the local region, of whom a fifth must be lawyers with at least ten years of experience or members of the Labor Public Ministry, similarly to other Regional Courts, they are named by the President of Brazil with approval from the Brazilian Senate.

Electoral Courts and Judges

The Brazilian Electoral system is controlled by the country's Judiciary, specifically the Regional Electoral Courts, the Superior Electoral Court and electoral judges, notably it does not have its own magistrature, being composed for the most part of magistrates from other Courts and the Judiciary.

The Superior Electoral Court is composed of seven members, three chosen from the ministers of Supreme Federal Court, two chosen from ministers of the Superior Court of Justice and two chosen from lawyers indicated by the Supreme Federal Court and named by the President of Brazil. Its jurisdiction involves the registry of Brazilian Policital Parties, the organization of Electoral Zones, the maintenance of its authority and its appellate jurisdiction over decisions of the Regional Courts

The Regional Courts are distributed through the country's State capitals, each composed of seven judges, two chosen from the second-instance State Courts, two chosen by the State Courts from the first-instance judges, one judge of the Regional Federal Court headquartered in the State's capital, or if there isn't, a Federal Judge, the last two are named from six lawyers of notable juridical knowledge indicated by the local State Court.

These Courts have jurisdiction over the registry of the Municipal and State Directories of Brazilian Political Parties, candidates to the positions of Governor, Vice-Governor, and Federal and Local Congressmen, the Courts organize the local Electoral Juntas, designating their headquarters and jurisdiction, have the duty to maintain their authority with a provision to call upon federal assistance, and also serve as an appellate court to judgements made by Electoral Judges.

The Electoral Judges are the State and Federal District first instance judges, their jurisdiction involves processing and judging common and electoral crimes, except those of jurisdiction of the Superior or Regional Courts, issue Electoral IDs and grant Electoral Transfer, take action to prevent illicit actions during elections.

Finally, the Electoral Juntas are composed of a Judge, who serves as president of the Junta, and two to four citizens with honest reputation. These Juntas are in charge of solving challenges and incidents regarding the counting of votes and issue Diplomas to the candidates elected in municipal elections.

Military Courts and Judges

The Military Justice system is divided between the Federal Military Justice and the State Military Justice, the first is in charge of matters concerning the Brazilian Armed Forces, while the second one has jurisdiction over the Auxiliary Forces, composed of the States' Military Police and Military Firefighters Corps.

The State Military Justice is organized on the State-level, with the first instance having a few particularities in regard to the officers rank and post, as the Auxiliary Forces do not have Generals, and the second instance being either a State-level Court of Military Justice or a specific board within the State's ordinary Court of Justice.

The first instance of the Federal Military Justice are the Councils of Justice, formed by a Military Judge and four officers, whose positions and rank depend on the accused, Councils are divided between Special Councils, with jurisdiction over officers and Permanent Councils, with jurisdiction over those of Enlisted rank.

The second instance of the Federal Military Justice is the Superior Military Court, which acts as an appellate court for the Councils of Justice and also for specific appeals from the second instance of the State Military Justice.

Courts and Judges of the States, Federal District and Territories

Trial courts
Each state territory is divided into judicial districts, which are composed of one or more municipalities. Each judicial district has at least one trial court that functions as a court of first instance for most cases. In large judicial districts with two or more trial courts, there may be Small claims courts as well as specialized courts by subject, such as courts handling exclusively criminal cases or family litigation. Judgments from the trial courts can be the subject of judicial review following appeals to the Courts of Justice.

Each court of first instance has a judge and may have a substitute judge. The judge decides alone in civil cases and most criminal cases, except that a jury has jurisdiction over willful crimes against life (murder, attempted murder, infanticide, abortion and inducement, instigation and assistance to suicide).

Courts of Justice

The highest court of a state judicial system is the Court of Justice. EachBrazilian state has only one Court of Justice, headquartered in the State's capital, functioning mostly as an appellate court. Second instance judgments are usually rendered by three judges, called desembargadores, however in specific cases the decision may be made by a single Judge. Large courts are usually divided into different sections, specialized by subject matter.

See also
 Federal courts of Brazil
 Judiciary of Portugal
 Law of Brazil
 Ministry of Justice (Brazil)

References

External links
Supremo Tribunal Federal
Conselho Nacional de Justiça 
Superior Tribunal de Justiça